Dubai City Football Club is an Emirati professional football club based in Al Barsha, Dubai.

History
The club was founded by Englishmen working in the King's school at Al Barsha, they began playing in the UAE Second Division League since its inception. They would achieve promotion in their second season in the third tier after topping their group and beating Al Mooj 2–1 but lose to Abtal Al Khaleej 0–3 in the final.

Current squad 

As of 2021–22 season

Honours
UAE Division Two
Runners-up (1): 2020–21

References

External links

Football clubs in Dubai
Dubai City
Association football clubs established in 2018
2018 establishments in the United Arab Emirates